Behind the Glass may refer to:

 Behind the Glass (TV series), Russian TV series
 Behind the Glass (film), Croatian film